Budgetary policy refers to government attempts to run a budget in equity or in surplus. The aim is to reduce the public debt.

It is not the same as a fiscal policy, which deals with the fiscal stimulus to the economy, the repartition of taxes and the generosity of allowances.

Government budgets